Sleepwalking is the debut studio album by American metalcore band Memphis May Fire. The album was released through Trustkill Records on July 21, 2009. This album is the first album to feature lead vocalist Matty Mullins after former lead vocalist Chase Ryan left the band in 2008. Scheduled to be released summer 2008, the release got delayed because of the line-up change. Mullins has described the album as "a new breed of rock 'n' roll" and musically it has "more aggressive guitar work and noticeably more melodic, but still retains that southern swagger."

The song "Ghost in the Mirror" was featured on the Saw VI Soundtrack with an accompanying music-video for the DVD-release of the movie.

Track listing
All lyrics written by Memphis May Fire, all music composed by Kellen McGregor and Memphis May Fire.

Personnel
Memphis May Fire
 Matty Mullins – lead vocals
 Kellen McGregor – lead guitar, backing vocals
 Ryan Bentley – rhythm guitar
 Cory Edler – bass
 Eric Molesworth – drums

Production
 Produced, mastered, and mixed by Casey Bates

References

External links
Memphis May Fire on Myspace
Sleepwalking on Trustkill

2009 debut albums
Memphis May Fire albums
Trustkill Records albums